Horace Moir Dick (16 June 1877 – 20 January 1930) was an Australian rules footballer who played with Essendon in the Victorian Football League (VFL). He also played for Williamstown in the Victorian Football Association from 1901-06 (96 games, 42 goals) and was captain in 1905-06 and became the Club's first-ever coach in 1906.  Shortly after his one appearance for Essendon, Dick transferred to Footscray during 1907 and played 12 games for the Tricolours, kicking two goals. His final game was the first semi-final of 1907 where Footscray were defeated by Williamstown by 14 points, on their way to 'Town's first-ever VFA premiership.

Notes

External links 

1877 births
1930 deaths
Australian rules footballers from Geelong
Williamstown Football Club players
Essendon Football Club players
Footscray Football Club (VFA) players